Nadarajan Periasamy is a Malaysian Indian Motorcycle Rider known by as Success P. Nada. He holds multiple motorcycle-related records in Malaysia.

Records

2007 

Nadarajan Periasamy achieved his first record on September 15, 2007 for "The Longest Motorcycle Standing Ride", in which he rode a 1500 cc Honda Gold Wing Touring motorcycle from Johor Bahru, Malaysia town to Bukit Kayu Hitam, Malaysia via "North-South Highway" over a distance of 933 km. The recorded time taken to complete the task was 10 hours and 45 minutes.

2010 

Nadarajan Periasamy Second record, for "Longest Motorcycle Ride",  was set on December 26, 2010, wherein he rode his 1500 cc Honda Gold Wing solo at the Sepang International Circuit (SIC) for 12 hours straight. The event started at 6:00 am and ended at 6:00 pm, covering a total distance of 875 km in 165 laps.

2011 

On February 12, 2011, Nadarajan Periasamy again set the record for "The Longest Standing Motorcycle Ride", riding his 1500 cc Honda Gold Wing from Komtar, Penang, Malaysia to Pattaya, Thailand. The event covered a distance of 1,410 km within 18 hours. The record was authenticated by Ripley’s Believe It Or Not! and awarded a formal recognition and certification at Ripley’s Museum in Pattaya, Thailand.

2011 

On December 3, 2011 Nadarajan Periasamy on the same year set the record again, riding 1800 cc Honda Gold Wingfrom Komtar, Penang, Malaysia to Hua Hin, Thailand. The event covered a distance of 980 km within 8 hours. The record was authenticated by Thailand Records and awarded formal recognition and certification present by protocol Thailand King at Thailand King Birthday Celebration of 85 years in Hua Hin.

2012 

On October 4 and 5 2012 Nadarajan Periasamy again set the record for “Longest Standing Motorcycle Ride". He rode 1800 cc Honda Gold Wing from Johor Bahru, Malaysia to Krabi, Thailand, covering a distance of 1410 km within 19 hours. The event was organized by 3 Nation Charity Ride Malaysia, Singapore and Thailand. The record was authenticated by Malaysian Book of Records.

2014

This record has been made by two participant Nadarajan Periasamy and Ganasan Thuraisamy, this record has been named "Longest Distance Motorcycle Ride By Duo" rode his 1800 cc Honda Gold Wing travelling entire highways, trunk road and city road in Malaysia total 5606 km has been covered and its took almost 4 days to finish the tour, once again he placed his name in Malaysian Book Of Records.

2015

This will be his 7th Malaysian Book Of Records, "Longest Distance Standing Motorcycle Ride" on 1800 cc Honda Gold Wing , journey begin from Gunung Jerai, Kedah, Malaysia followed by the destinations Bukit Bendera, Penang, Malaysia, Gua Musang, Pahang, Malaysia and finish line at Cameron Highland, Pahang, Malaysia. This record has been achieved on 8 August 2015. Total 1150 km has been covered.
The record was authenticated by Malaysian Book Of Records and for this achievement was given a formal recognition and certification record by Malaysian Book Of Records. This full event supported by Yayasan Pemotoran Nasional(YPN), Penang,State Government, Jabatan Kerja Raya(JKR), Penang, Malaysia and Polis Diraja Malaysia, Pahang & Polis Diraja Malaysia, Kelantan.

References

External links
 Bike Ride
 Achievement (in Malaysian)
 All Around Malaysia
 The Star

Malaysian people of Indian descent
Malaysian motorcycle racers
1963 births
Living people